Sophia Stuart (born June 22, 1606, in Greenwich at Palace of Placentia and died June 23, 1606) was the fourth daughter and last of nine children of James VI and I and Anne of Denmark.

Biography

Anne of Denmark was rumoured to be pregnant at the end of October 1605. Robert Naunton wrote that courtiers were uncertain because her figure was concealed by her farthingale. In May 1606 she stopped holding audiences with ambassadors including Zorzi Giustinian.

Anne of Denmark prepared herself for childbirth at the Palace of Placentia, or Greenwich Palace in May.  Her lady in waiting, Audrey Walsingham, bought linen and lacework to the value of £614 for her lying-in. Sophia Stuart was born early in the morning of Sunday 22 June 1606 . Anne was attended by a midwife, Alice Dennis, and a physician, Peter Chamberlen, who had both helped at the birth of Mary Stuart in April 1605. Chamberlen is thought to have been the inventor of birthing forceps. Anne gave him a diamond ring for his efforts. 

Sophia grew "verye weake" and was baptised by James Montague, Dean of the Chapel Royal. She was named after her grandmother Sophie of Mecklenburg-Güstrow. Ninth and last child of James I of England and Queen Anne of Denmark, her body was carried on the Thames in a barge covered with black velvet to be buried in Westminster Abbey on 26 June.

A cancelled tournament
There had been plans to hold a tournament at Greenwich to celebrate the birth and baptism. A challenge had been issued in the name of the "Four Knights Errant of the Fortunate Island" on 1 June 1606. The comic text of the challenge made King James laugh. Sophia's uncle Christian IV of Denmark was expected to attend. The event was cancelled.

Christian IV arrived in England and went to see his grieving sister at Greenwich on 18 July. Christian IV was entertained by the king at Theobalds while Anne remained at Greenwich, still in the apartments set aside for her confinement. Anne was "churched" in a private ceremony at Greenwich by Dr Montague on 3 August. Before leaving England, Christian IV competed with King James at running at the ring.

Monument at Westminster Abbey
Sophia's monument at Westminster Abbey resembling a stone crib was designed by Maximilian Colt and painted and gilded by John de Critz. The tomb is finely carved with lacework and an embroidered velvet cover. Its Latin inscription may be translated, "Sophia, a royal rosebud untimely plucked by Fate and from James, King of Great Britain, France and Ireland, and Queen Anne her parents, snatched away, to flower again in the rose garden of Christ, lies here. 23rd June, 4th year of the reign of King James 1606".

Notes

Bibliography 
 

1606 births
1606 deaths
17th-century English people
17th-century English women
English princesses
Mary
Burials at Westminster Abbey
Children of James VI and I
Royalty and nobility who died as children
Daughters of kings